Daechwita is a genre of Korean traditional music consisting of military music played by wind and percussion instruments, generally performed while marching or as a static performance.

Instrumentation 

Instruments used include nabal (brass horn), nagak (seashell horn), and taepyeongso (shawm), with jing (gong), jabara (cymbals), and yonggo (hangul: 용고; hanja: 龍鼓; drum painted with dragon designs and played with hard mallets).

This style of Korean military music is often used in the reenactment of the Guard Changing Ceremony at Seoul's Gyeongbok Palace, as well as in Deoksu Palace. A special daechwita today is under the service of the Traditional Guard Unit, 3rd Infantry Division, Republic of Korea Army, and is the only one that also has the Ulla (small tuned gongs), Pungmul-buk and Galgo in its instrumentation. This is the same case for traditional Korean bands outside the homeland, which also have a pungmul marching percussion battery (with kkwaenggwari, janggu and pungmul-buk drums) at the rear with distinguishing uniforms between the two ensembles. Few modern bands based in schools sport bass drums together with the kwaennggwari, galgo and janggu as part of their instrumentation. 

Uniforms in the band are in royal gold or red and white, as these were connected in the Imperial period to the Imperial family and the armed forces of the Empire. Most bandsmen in ensembles today wear the royal gold full dress.

The Bandmaster of the ensemble carries a long baton to direct the ensemble.

Chwi-ta

Chwi-ta (or choi-ta) is the name of the military music played in military processions, military parades and on such occasions as when the gates to military headquarters were opened or closed.

Popular culture
South Korean rapper Agust D, also known as Suga from BTS, released a rap song called 'Daechwita (대취타)' on his second solo mixtape D-2 (2020). The song is heavily inspired by and samples daechwita performed by the National Gugak Center.

References

External links 
 Daechwita page

Korean traditional music
Military music
Military of Korea
Korean military bands